Mithra Kurian  (born Dalma Kurian), is an Indian actress who works in Malayalam and Tamil films. Her notable works include  Bodyguard (2010) and  Kaavalan (2011).

Biography
She first appeared in a supporting role in the 2004 Malayalam movie,  Vismayathumbathu, in a single scene as Nayanthara's friend, directed by Fazil. She then appeared in 2005 film Mayookham directed by T. Hariharan, following which she took a break from acting and concentrated on her studies. She was then cast by director Siddique in a supporting role for his Tamil film Sadhu Miranda (2008), after he saw Mithra on a cover of an issue of the magazine Grihalakshmi. Afterwards, she starred in another Tamil film, the low-budget venture Suriyan Satta Kalloori (2009), which was panned by critics.

Mithra subsequently appeared in notable Malayalam films, and gained considerable attention, by her choice of characters in films like Gulumal: The Escape (2009) and Bodyguard (2010). She was the lead actress in the comedy flick Gulumal, which turned out to be a superhit movie. She appeared as a supporting character in the Dileep-starrer Bodyguard, again under Siddique's direction, which became another hit. Gaining critical acclaim for her performance as Sethulakshmi, she was selected by Siddique to reprise the role in its Tamil remake, Kaavalan, as well. She went to act in a few more Tamil and Malayalam films which didn't earn much recognition.

Other works
She has judged popular reality shows Dance Party and Mummy and Me both on Kairali TV.

After her marriage, she made her debut into TV serial in Tamil with Priyasaki.

Personal life
Mithra was born as Dalma to Malayali Syrian Christian parents Kurian and Baby, on 15 May 1989, at Perumbavoor, Kerala. She has a younger brother, Dani Kurian. She completed her Bachelor of Business Administration (B.B.A.). She is a distant relative of Nayantara. In January 2015, she married her long-time beau William Francis at a ceremony in Kochi.

KSRTC officials filed a complaint against Mithra accusing her of assaulting and verbally abusing one of its staff. The complaint states that Mithra, along with her friends entered KSRTC bus stand premises, where entry of non-KSRTC vehicles are barred. The complaint says she assaulted driver Ramdas for scratching her car.

Filmography

Films

Television

References

External links

Living people
Indian film actresses
Actresses from Kerala
People from Ernakulam district
1989 births
Actresses in Malayalam cinema
Actresses in Tamil cinema
21st-century Indian actresses
Indian television actresses
Actresses in Tamil television
Actresses in Malayalam television